Professor Richard Cogdell FRS FRSE (born 4 February 1949) is plant molecular biologist and holds the Hooker Chair of Botany at the University of Glasgow. Cogdell is the director of Glasgow Biomedical Research Centre, with a principal research interest in the structure and function of purple bacterial photosynthetic membrane proteins. Cogdell has authored over 250 peer-reviewed journal articles, and was a member of the Council of the BBSRC from 2014 to 2018.

Education
Cogdell was educated at Royal Grammar School, Guildford and the University of Bristol where he studied biochemistry obtaining a BSc in 1970 and a PhD in 1973.

Career
From 1973 to 1975 Cogdell carried out postdoctoral research at Cornell University and University of Washington and was a lecturer in botany at the University of Glasgow from 1975 to 1978. He was a  visiting professor at UCLA in 1979 and the University of Paris-Sud in 2004. From 2007 to 2007 he was adjunct professor at the Chinese Academy of Sciences' Institute of Biophysics in Beijing.

Cogdell's primary research interest is in the early events of bacterial photosynthesis, specifically on the involvement of pigment-protein complexes in light harvesting and energy transfer using protein crystallography and various methods of spectroscopy. His collaboration with other related groups culminated in a 1995 scientific paper describing the three dimensional structure of a light-harvesting complex from the bacterium, Rhodopseudomas acidophila. Subsequent collaborations with physics and chemistry research teams have led to a more complete understanding of the various energy transfer reactions involved in light harvesting.

He is now exploring the potential applications of these discoveries to the production of fuels using sunlight and founded the Glasgow Solar Fuels Initiative with Leroy Cronin in Glasgow  to coordinate the work of other research groups within Glasgow University and others in the USA, Japan, Germany, Italy and Poland.

Cogdell has been Editor-in-Chief of the Royal Society journal Interface since 2019.

Awards and honours
Cogdell was elected a Fellow of the Royal Society in 2007 His citation reads as follows;

He was elected a Fellow of the Royal Society of Edinburgh in 1991 and he is also a Fellow of the Royal Society of Biology.

 Humboldt Prize 1995
 Daiwa-Adrian Prize 2001

References

External links
 Richard Cogdell's webpage at University of Glasgow
 ORCID iD

Living people